Mr. Asia (亞洲先生競選), is a male beauty pageant contest run by Mr. Asia contest Organization based in Hong Kong

Recent titleholders

By number of wins
Competition

Runner-up

See All
Manhunt International
Mister World
Mister International
Chinese:Mr. Asia Contest

External links
Page facebook Mr. asia contese
Male beauty pageants
Continental beauty pageants